The 1986 ICF Canoe Sprint World Championships were held in Montreal, Canada at the Notre Dame Island. This is also where the canoeing and rowing competitions for the 1976 Summer Olympics took place.

The men's competition consisted of six Canadian (single paddle, open boat) and nine kayak events. Three events were held for the women, all in kayak.

This was the 20th championships in canoe sprint.

Medal summary

Men's

Canoe

Kayak

Women's

Kayak

Medals table

References
ICF medalists for Olympic and World Championships - Part 1: flatwater (now sprint): 1936-2007.
ICF medalists for Olympic and World Championships - Part 2: rest of flatwater (now sprint) and remaining canoeing disciplines: 1936-2007.

Icf Canoe Sprint World Championships, 1986
Icf Canoe Sprint World Championships, 1986
ICF Canoe Sprint World Championships
International sports competitions hosted by Canada
Canoeing and kayaking competitions in Canada